The Popular Front for the Realization of the Objectives of the Revolution, abbreviated as the Popular Front (ej-Jabha), is a leftist political and electoral alliance in Tunisia, made up of nine political parties and numerous independents.

The number of parties involved in the coalition has since decreased to nine. Approximately 15,000 people attended the coalition's first meeting in Tunis.

History
The Tunisian Revolution in 2011 saw the departure of President Zine El Abidine Ben Ali, the dissolution of his party, the Democratic Constitutional Rally, and the holding of fresh elections for the creation of a new constitution. This saw the Tunisian political scene dominated by the Islamist Ennahda Movement, and its allies the Democratic Forum for Labour and Liberties, the Progressive Democratic Party, and the Congress for the Republic.

Former Prime Minister Béji Caïd Essebsi then decided to return to Tunisian political life, and formed a new party known as the Nidaa Tounes, which is mostly composed of secular Tunisians, including centrists and those who are more right wing, including former supporters of the RCD. Twelve leftist parties then decided to form a Popular Front in order to better consolidate the previously divided Tunisian left wing so as to be able to compete more effectively in the upcoming elections.

Murder of Chokri Belaid
The 48-year-old coordinator of the Popular Front coalition, Chokri Belaid, was killed by an unknown gunman on 6 February 2013. An estimated 1,400,000 people took part in his funeral, while protesters clashed with police and Ennahda supporters, who held a separate rally, attended by an estimated 15,000 people, on the day of the funeral defending the party against calls to give up power. The ruling Ennahda Movement denied involvement in his death. The Popular Front, along with the secular Republican Party and Nidaa Tounes, subsequently announced they would withdraw from the national assembly and call for a general strike. On 9 April 2013, Mohamed Brahmi, General Secretary of the minor People's Movement, which holds 2 seats in the National Constituent Assembly, announced the decision of his party to join the Popular Front.

Murder of Mohamed Brahmi
On 25 July 2013, Mohamed Brahmi, a founder and former member of the Popular Front, was assassinated. Numerous protests erupted in the streets following his assassination.

Election results

Member parties

Current
Workers' Party (PT; formerly Tunisian Workers' Communist Party) led by Hamma Hammami. (Marxism–Leninism)
Party of United Democratic Patriots (Watad), merger of:
Democratic Patriots' Movement (MOUPAD) led by Ziad Lakhdhar, formerly led by Chokri Belaid, until his assassination. (Marxism–Leninism, Maoism, Pan-Arabism)
Democratic Patriotic Workers' Party (PTPD), led by Mohamed Jmour. (Marxism–Leninism)
Tunisian Ba'ath Movement led by Othmen Bel Haj Amor, part of the pro-Iraqi Ba'ath Party. (Ba'athism)
, founded in July 2013 by Mohamed Brahmi after his resignation from the Popular Movement and shortly before his assassination, now led by Zouhair Hamdi and Brahmi's widow Mbarka Aouainia.
The Pole (al Qotb), led by Riadh Ben Fadhel, joined the Popular Front in June 2013.
Workers' Left League (LGO), led by Jalel Ben Brik Zoghlami. (Trotskyism)
 (PPLP) led by Jalloul Azzouna. (Socialism)
 led by Kheireddine Souabni. (Ba'athism)
Unionist Popular Front led by Amor Mejri. (Pan-Arabism, Marxism)

Former
These parties were temporarily affiliated with the Popular Front, but have left it:
Movement of Socialist Democrats (MDS) (Democratic socialism)
People's Movement formerly led by Mohamed Brahmi (Arab nationalism, Nasserism)
Progressive People's Party, led by Mohamed Lassoued (Marxism–Leninism)
Green Tunisia Party, led by Abdelkader Zitouni (Eco-socialism, Green politics)

See also
Popular Unity Movement
Popular Unity Party (Tunisia)
Socialist Party (Tunisia)
Union for Tunisia
Unionist Democratic Union

References

External links

Facebook

 
2012 establishments in Tunisia